Live from Japan is an album and a concert video by blues rock guitarist and singer Johnny Winter.  It was recorded at Zepp music hall in Tokyo on April 15, 2011.  This was the last night of a three-concert run by Winter, his first live performances in Japan.

The album was released in April 2015 as a CD, and also as a two-disc vinyl LP.  The concert video was released in July 2012 in DVD format.

Critical reception
Writing about the album on AllMusic, Mark Deming said, "A mobile recording system was on hand to capture the historic event, and Live from Japan documents a typically fiery show from the Texas guitar slinger, showing off his powerful instrumental style as he wails through a set of blues standards."

Writing about the video on Folk & Acoustic Music Exchange, Mark S. Tucker said, "As the concert proceeds and that well steeped blues blood of his stirs, Winter gets more animated, his own music infecting him as much as the audience.... By the time he lights into "Got My Mojo Working", everything's up to speed and kinetic, even with the august gent still seated. Johnny becomes what he is: a blues king holding court and showering blessings on the people. From there, you're buckled in for the ride."

Track listing
"Hideaway" (Freddie King, Sonny Thompson) – 4:29
"Sugar Coated Love" (Jay Miller) – 5:51
"She Likes to Boogie Real Low" (Frankie L. Sims, Joe Corona) – 3:59
"Good Morning Little Schoolgirl" (Sonny Boy Williamson) – 4:12
"Got My Mojo Working" (Preston Foster, King, Thompson) – 7:00
"Johnny B. Goode" (Chuck Berry) – 4:16
"Blackjack" (Ray Charles) – 8:16
"All Tore Down" (Johnny Winter) – 2:57
"Lone Wolf" (Winter) – 4:51
"Don't Take Advantage of Me" (Winter) – 7:46
"Bony Maronie" (Larry Williams) – 5:16
"It's All Over Now" (Bobby Womack, Shirley Womack) – 4:47
"Dust My Broom" (Robert Johnson) – 7:18
"Highway 61 Revisited" (Bob Dylan) – 6:38

Personnel
The Johnny Winter Band
Johnny Winter – guitar, vocals
Paul Nelson – guitar
Scott Spray – bass
Vito Liuzzi – drums, vocals
Production
Produced by Paul Nelson
Packaging design, photos: Marion Amundsen
Liner notes: Lance Purdue

References

Johnny Winter albums
2015 live albums